Michael Morton (born 1964) is an American restaurateur. He is the co-founder of Morton Group which operates La Cave Wine & Food Hideaway inside Wynn Las Vegas, CRUSH inside MGM Grand and La Comida in Downtown Las Vegas. He is also the former owner and co-founder of N9NE Group and the son of Arnie Morton, the founder of the Morton's Steakhouse.

Biography
Michael Morton is the son of Zorine and Arnie Morton, who founded Morton's Steakhouse restaurants. His father was of Jewish descent. Raised in Chicago, Morton spent most of his young life in restaurants, which contributed to his co-founding the N9NE Steakhouse in 2000 with Scott DeGraff. Before co-founding N9NE, Morton and DeGraff were known for having opened Drink and Eat, Too in Chicago in 1992. The psychedelic dance club featured inventive touches like a VIP bar in an elevator shaft and drinks served in baby bottles; they would later open Drink! in Las Vegas in 1995.  Morton and DeGraff had many successful years with N9NE Group, opening Las Vegas-based megaclub Rain, the tower-topping Ghostbar and N9NE Steakhouse, which created a trend of club-like restaurants that dominate the Strip today.  Morton has been credited for having created some of the first lucrative, non-gaming nightlife ventures in Las Vegas including N9NE, Rain, Ghostbar, Moon, Nove Italiano and the Playboy Club, all located in the Palms Casino. 

Michael founded Morton Group in 2010 with his wife, Jenna Morton, to open a new portfolio of restaurants, selling his share of N9NE Group in 2011. Morton Group's first restaurant, La Cave Wine & Food Hideaway, opened at Wynn Las Vegas at the end of 2010.  His focus on Morton Group is a reflection of his desire to develop restaurants, like his father, as opposed to Vegas nightclubs. The pair followed La Cave's success with the debut of a funky, urban  Mexican Restaurant, La Comida, which opened in Downtown Las Vegas' burgeoning Fremont East Entertainment District in May 2013, and then with CRUSH, a highly social restaurant and bar serving American cuisine, at MGM Grand in December 2013.

Current Restaurants
La Cave Wine & Food Hideaway serves an upscale menu of American small-plates with items from the sea, farm, garden, oven and grill, prepared by Morton Group's Corporate Executive Chef William DeMarco. Reminiscent of a vintner’s tasting room, La Cave presents a multi-sensory journey including mood, food and music, perfect for gatherings of two or 200.  La Comida uses traditional ingredients and family culinary secrets from various regions in Mexico combined with the sophisticated influence of Mexico City. The restaurant brings a funky, American rock-n-roll vibe to Mexican food in one of Sin City's hippest areas.  CRUSH, located in MGM Grand, offers a selection of American cuisine, also by DeMarco. Among the “Best Places to Party…While Having Dinner” and “The Best Restaurants in Vegas, Right Now” by Thrillist, the highly social restaurant and bar offers a range of dishes to satisfy foodies and casual diners, alike.

Family
Morton comes from a long family history of hospitality, which includes ventures in Chicago, Las Vegas and other major cities around the United States. Of Arnie Morton's seven children, five have opened their own concept restaurants, including Michael. He is the brother of Peter Morton, the founder and former owner of the Hard Rock Hotel and Casino and co-founder of Hard Rock Cafe. He is also the brother of David Morton, the co-owner of DMK Restaurants, a group in Chicago that operates DMK Burger Bar as well as Fish Bar, Ada Street and more. He is the uncle of Harry Morton, the President and CEO of the Mexican Restaurant Chain Pink Taco. Michael resides full time in Las Vegas with his wife, Michigan-native Jenna Marie (née Devries) and three children.

Philanthropy
Michael and his wife are involved in a variety of philanthropic pursuits around the Las Vegas Valley. In particular, the Mortons donate time to After-School All-Stars (ASAS), which expands the learning day for low-income students. Michael's natural interest in the program comes from his father Arnie, who adopted Westinghouse High School, an inner-city school, when Michael was young. Arnie Morton would bring students to Morton's Steakhouse to speak with them and give them a tour of the kitchen; Michael has followed in those footsteps by bringing students to CRUSH as part of ASAS's CEO: Boss Life program.

References

1964 births
Living people
Businesspeople from Chicago
American restaurateurs
American people of Jewish descent
Morton family (restaurants)